Kolichal is a small village town located in Kanhangad-Panathur State Highway.

References

Villages in Kasaragod district